The 2nd Welsh Division was a 2nd Line Territorial Force division of the British Army in the First World War. The division was formed as a duplicate of the 53rd (Welsh) Division in January 1915. As the name suggests, the division recruited in Wales, but also included units from Cheshire and Herefordshire in England. In August 1915, in common with all Territorial Force divisions, it was numbered as 68th (2nd Welsh) Division. During the winter of 1917–18, the division was extensively reorganized and lost its territorial identity; henceforth it was known as 68th Division.

It served on home defence duties throughout the war, whilst recruiting, training and supplying drafts to overseas units and formations.  It was stationed for most of the war in East Anglia, particularly in Norfolk and Suffolk and never left the UK.  It was eventually disbanded in March 1919.

History
In accordance with the Territorial and Reserve Forces Act 1907 (7 Edw.7, c.9) which brought the Territorial Force into being, the TF was intended to be a home defence force for service during wartime and members could not be compelled to serve outside the country. However, on the outbreak of war on 4 August 1914, many members volunteered for Imperial Service.  Therefore, TF units were split into 1st Line (liable for overseas service) and 2nd Line (home service for those unable or unwilling to serve overseas) units.  2nd Line units performed the home defence role, although in fact most of these were also posted abroad in due course.

On 15 August 1915, TF units were instructed to separate home service men from those who had volunteered for overseas service (1st Line), with the home service personnel to be formed into reserve units (2nd Line).  On 31 August, 2nd Line units were authorized for each 1st Line unit where more than 60% of men had volunteered for overseas service.  After being organized, armed and clothed, the 2nd Line units were gradually grouped into large formations thereby forming the 2nd Line divisions.  These 2nd Line units and formations had the same name and structure as their 1st Line parents.  On 24 November, it was decided to replace imperial service (1st Line) formations as they proceeded overseas with their reserve (2nd Line) formations.  A second reserve (3rd Line) unit was then formed at the peace headquarters of the 1st Line.

As a result, the 2nd Welsh Division was formed in January 1915 with the 2nd North Wales, 2nd Cheshire and 2nd Welsh Border Brigades as a 2nd Line duplicate of the Welsh Division.

Order of battle

Commanders
The 68th (2nd Welsh) Division had the following commanders:

See also

 53rd (Welsh) Division for the 1st Line formation
 List of British divisions in World War I

Notes

References

Bibliography

External links

Infantry divisions of the British Army in World War I
Military units and formations established in 1915
Military units and formations disestablished in 1919
1915 establishments in the United Kingdom